Henri Attal (1936 in Paris – 2003) was a French actor.

Selected filmography

External links 

 Fragments d'un dictionnaire amoureux

1936 births
2003 deaths
Male actors from Paris
French male film actors
French male television actors